Sharplin is a surname. The Concise Oxford Dictionary of Family Names in Britain states that its origin is "unexplained", and that there were 71 holders of the name, in London and Essex, in the 1881 United Kingdom census.

Notable people with the surname include:
Roy Sharplin (born 1966), Canadian slalom canoer
Tom Sharplin, winner of 2002 Benny Award

See also
Sharplin v Henderson, 1990 New Zealand law case
Sharplin Falls, tramping destination on Mount Somers / Te Kiekie in New Zealans
Sharplin Falls Scenic Reserve, a Scenic reserve in New Zealand

References

English-language surnames